Dalkeith Thistle Football Club are a Scottish football club from the town of Dalkeith, Midlothian. Formed in 1892, the team plays in the East of Scotland Football League (Conference B), having moved from the junior leagues in 2018.

Dalkeith Thistle's home strip is black and gold. Their change strip is navy blue and sky blue.

They play their home matches at King's Park, which has room for roughly 2,000 spectators. The new pavilion was erected in 2007, and floodlights were installed at the ground in 2013. There is also a community and youth wing to the club which operates out of Cowden Park in the town's Woodburn neighbourhood.

From 2020, newly formed EoSFL adult team Edinburgh South will ground-share at Dalkeith, due to the ground used by their many youth teams in The Inch, Edinburgh not meeting requirements.

Honours
Edinburgh & District League winners: 1931–32, 1955–56, 1960–61
East Region South Division winners: 2011–12
East Region Division Two winners: 1979–80, 1989–90, 1991–92
East of Scotland Junior Cup: 1966–67, 1971–72
Brown Cup: 1955–56, 1969–70
Dalmeny Cup: 1910–11
Marshall Cup: 1910–11

References

External links
Club Website: www.dalkeiththistle.co.uk

 
Football clubs in Scotland
Scottish Junior Football Association clubs
Football in Midlothian
Association football clubs established in 1892
1892 establishments in Scotland
East of Scotland Football League teams